Michael James Walsh (September 2, 1858 – May 2, 1933) was a Canadian politician.

Born in Montreal, Canada East, Walsh was a member of the Montreal City Council from 1902 to 1906. He was elected to the Legislative Assembly of Quebec for Montréal division no. 6 in 1904. A Liberal, he was defeated in 1908. He was elected in a 1908 by-election and was defeated in 1912.

He was a member of the Ancient Order of United Workmen and the Ancient Order of Hibernians.

He died in Westmount, Quebec in 1933.

References

1858 births
1933 deaths
Quebec Liberal Party MNAs
Burials at Notre Dame des Neiges Cemetery